Welborn Village Archeological Site (12 Po 19), also known as the Murphy's Landings site, is an archaeological site of the prehistoric Caborn-Welborn culture variant of the Mississippian culture of indigenous peoples of North America.

Welborn Village Archeological Site is located on Hovey Lake, a backwater lake near the Ohio River close to its confluence with the Wabash River.

See also
 Slack Farm
 List of Mississippian sites

References

Caborn-Welborn culture
Native American history of Indiana
Archaeological sites in Indiana
Geography of Posey County, Indiana